Gary Steel (born 11 June 1954) is  a former Australian rules footballer who played with Footscray in the Victorian Football League (VFL).

Gary Steel author of Polished Honey

Notes

External links 
		

Living people
1954 births
Australian rules footballers from Victoria (Australia)
Western Bulldogs players